State Route 198 (SR 198) is a  route that serves as a connection between SR 30 and SR 239 in Clayton.

Route description
The western terminus of SR 198 is located at its intersection with SR 239 (S/N Midway Street) in downtown Clayton. From this point, the route travels in an easterly direction before turning to the south en route to its eastern terminus at SR 30 (Southern Bypass). It is known as Eufaula Avenue for its entire length.

Major intersections

References

External links

198
Transportation in Barbour County, Alabama